This is a list of China national football team's all kinds of competitive records.

Individual records

Player records 
.
Players in bold are still active with China.

Most capped players

Top goalscorers

Manager records 
 Most manager appearances
  Gao Fengwen: 56

Team records 
 Biggest victory
 19–0 vs. Guam, 26 January 2000

Competitive record

FIFA World Cup

China has only appeared at the one World Cup with the appearance being in the 2002 FIFA World Cup where they finished bottom of the group which included a 4–0 loss to Brazil.

AFC Asian Cup

Summer Olympics

For 1992 to 2016, see China national under-23 football team

Asian Games

* Including 1998 onwards (until 2010)

For 2002  to 2018, see China national under-23 football team

EAFF East Asian Cup

Head-to-head record
The China national football team has played over 500 matches with the teams of other nations from around the world, and has won approximately half of them. 
, Counted for the FIFA A-level match only.

References

Sources
Fixtures and Results on FIFA.com 
Team China Official Website 
China International Matches on RSSSF 
China Matches on Elo Ratings

China national football team records and statistics
National association football team records and statistics